William Coxe  (8 June 1828) was an English historian and priest who served as a travelling companion and tutor to nobility from 1771 to 1786. He wrote numerous historical works and travel chronicles. Ordained a deacon in 1771, he served as a rector and then archdeacon of Bemerton near Salisbury from 1786 until his death.

Biography
He was the older brother of the writer and poet Peter Coxe (c. 1753–1844), who wrote the poem "Social Day". Following his father's death in 1760, his mother married John Christopher Smith, who was Handel's amanuensis.

Educated at Marylebone Grammar School (1753–54) and then at Eton College (1754–64), Coxe matriculated to King's College, Cambridge at Easter 1765. He received his BA in 1769, and his MA in 1772. From 1768 to 1771, he was a fellow of King's College. Coxe was ordained a deacon in London on 21 December 1771 and a priest on 15 March 1772.

Coxe travelled throughout Europe as a tutor and travelling companion to various noblemen and gentlemen, including Lord Herbert, son of the Earl of Pembroke; and Samuel Whitbread of the brewing family. He wrote prodigious and detailed accounts of his travels with Lord Herbert around the Swiss and French Alps, which were subsequently published.

In 1786 he was appointed vicar of Kingston upon Thames, and in 1788 rector of Fugglestone St Peter-with-Bemerton, Wiltshire. He also held the rectory of Stourton, Wiltshire from 1801 to 1811 and that of Fovant from 1811 until his death. In 1791 he was made prebendary of Salisbury, and in 1804 Archdeacon of Wilts until his death twenty-four years later at age 80. He died on 8 June 1828 in Bemerton, and was buried in the chancel of St Peter's Church at Fugglestone St Peter.

In 1803, Coxe married Eleanora, daughter of William Shairp, consul-general for Russia, and widow of Thomas Yeldham of St Petersburg.

Coxe's literary style featured a detached, unemotional, objective voice that, though typical of the historiography of his day, came to be seen as arch and quaint by later generations.

Works

In addition to his travel writing, during his long residence at Bemerton Coxe was mainly occupied in literary work. His publications included:

References

Citations

External links
 
 William Coxe at the Open Library
 Travels in Switzerland by William Coxe  at Viatimages
 Travels in Switzerland by William Coxe  at wdl.org

1747 births
1828 deaths
19th-century English historians
Writers from London
Alumni of King's College, Cambridge
Fellows of King's College, Cambridge
People educated at Eton College
Archdeacons of Wilts
Fellows of the Royal Society